F. Ann Millner is an American politician, and former university administrator. A Republican, Millner is a member of the Utah State Senate representing 5th District since 2023. She previously represented the 18th District starting in 2015. She was previously the 11th president of Weber State University from 2002 to 2012, having been appointed to that role after 20 years of serving the university as an educator and administrator.

Biography
Millner received a B.S. in Education from the University of Tennessee, an M.S. in Allied Health Education and Management from Southwest Texas State University, and an Ed.D. in Educational Administration from Brigham Young University (BYU) in 1986.

Millner then worked in a variety of positions at educational institutions.  She was Education Coordinator of the Medical Technology Program at Vanderbilt University, Instructional Developer in Medical Technology at Thomas Jefferson University, a Lecturer at the School of Health Professions, Southwest Texas State University, and Associate Director of Continuing Education at the Edmonda Campus of Gwynedd Mercy College.  She began employment at Weber State College in 1982, and held such positions as Director of Outreach Education in the School of Allied Health Sciences, Assistant Vice President for Community Partnerships, Associate Dean of Continuing Education, and in 1993 she became Vice President for University Relations.

Millner has been involved in various community and academic organizations.  She is the current chair of the Utah Campus Compact and a board member for Intermountain Health Care, the Ogden/Weber Chamber of Commerce, the Weber Economic Development Corporation, and Coalition for Utah's Future.  She has been a member of the NCAA I-AA/I-AAA Presidential Advisory Group, the Council of State Representatives for the American Association of State Colleges and Universities, and the Ogden Rotary Club. A Baptist, she is the only Republican in the Utah legislature who is not a member of the Church of Jesus Christ of Latter-day Saints.

Political career 
In 2014, Millner ran for the State Senate seat in Utah's 18th district. She defeated Democrat Mat Wenzel, and has been serving as a Senator since 2015. In the Senate, Millner sits on the following committees:
 Business, Economic Development, and Labor Appropriations Subcommittee
 Higher Education Appropriations Subcommittee
 Senate Education Committee
 Senate Economic Development and Workforce Services committee

Election results

Legislation

2016 sponsored bills

Notable legislation 
During Utah's 2016 legislative session, the Senate passed Senate Bill 149, sponsored by Millner, which will allow Utah's grading system to adjust automatically as student proficiency improves.

References 

Brigham Young University alumni
Living people
Texas State University alumni
Texas State University faculty
University of Tennessee alumni
Vanderbilt University administrators
Presidents of Weber State University
Women state legislators in Utah
Republican Party Utah state senators
21st-century American politicians
21st-century American women politicians
Year of birth missing (living people)
Baptists from the United States
Women heads of universities and colleges
20th-century American academics
21st-century American academics